Saint-Clair-de-Halouze is a commune in the Orne department in north-western France. It is situated midway between Domfront and Flers. It was originally a centre for ferrous mining and the little community, the minehead and the railway line, now a path, remain. The small river Halouze flows through the village on its way to join the Varenne (Loire basin).

See also
Communes of the Orne department

References

Saintclairdehalouze